The following is a list of rulers of the Jolof Empire.  The Jolof Empire (French language – Diolof or Djolof) was a West African state that ruled parts of Senegal and The Gambia from 1360 to 1890.

The rulers were known as "Buur-ba Jolof". Their surnames were Njie (or Ndiaye).

Rulers of the Jolof Empire

Names and dates taken from John Stewart's African States and Rulers (1989).

Jolof became part of the Senegal Colony in 1889.

References

See also
History of The Gambia
History of Senegal
Jolof Empire

History of Senegal
History of the Gambia
Wolof
Wolof